Etheosomatidae is a species-rich subfamily of freshwater ray-finned fish, the members of which are commonly known as the darters. The subfamily is part of the family Percidae which also includes the perches, ruffes and pikeperches. The family is endemic to North America. It consists of 3-5 different genera and well over 200 species.

Characteristics
They have two pterygiophores between the first and second dorsal fins which do not have spines and a reduced swimbladder which may be completely lacking. The common name "darter" owes to the behavior of the fish, which dart around their benthic habitat. They are sexually dimorphic; most species have males with bright colors and patterning, particularly when breeding. These colors and patterns are used to attract females and allow for recognition of species, as the colors and patterns are particular to each species. Many species use typical sites for spawning and they care for their eggs and fry. They have evolved a variety of methods of depositing eggs and these include burying them, which may be the basal habit as it is found in all genera, as well as attaching eggs to a substrate and egg clustering.

Distribution
Etheostomatinae darters are endemic to North America where they are found in the Mississippi River basin and the drainages of the Great Lakes, Hudson Bay, the seaboards of the Atlantic and the Gulf of Mexico and the Pacific coast of Mexico.

Taxonomy
Fishbase recognises 5 genera as follows:

 Ammocrypta Jordan, 1877
 Crystallaria Jordan & Gilbert, 1885
 Etheostoma Rafinesque, 1817
 Nothonotus Putnam, 1863
 Percina Haldeman, 1842

However, Fishbase places Crystallaria within the subfamily Percinae while the 5th Edition of Fishes of the World regard it as a subgenus of Ammocrypta and Nothonotus as a subgenus of Etheostoma.

References

Percidae
Ray-finned fish subfamilies